Attila Brungs is the Vice-Chancellor and President of the University of New South Wales. He was appointed to the role in January 2022. Prior to this role, he was the Vice-Chancellor and President of the University of Technology Sydney (UTS); a role that he held from July 2014 to October 2022.

Career
Brungs has been a researcher in both industry and academia, with interests in the area of heterogeneous catalysis. Brungs is an elected Fellow of the Royal Society of New South Wales and an elected Fellow of the Australian Academy of Technology and Engineering.

As Vice-Chancellor of UTS, Brungs has been instrumental in the university's rise to Australia's position among the world's top young universities, including supporting the transformation of the UTS campus with the addition of the Dr Chau Chak Wing Building, designed by Frank Gehry, the Faculty of Engineering and Information Technology Building, the Vicki Sara Building and the UTS Central Building through a $1.5 billion campus master plan. Central to Brungs' approach at UTS has been collaboration, engaging with industry to tackle real-world research problems and the community to tackle social justice issues. Under his stewardship, the university's commitment to delivering positive social good has been strengthened through the creation of UTS's Social Impact Framework.

Prior to his appointment as Deputy Vice-Chancellor (Research) at UTS in September 2009, Brungs was General Manager, Science Investment, Strategy and Performance at CSIRO. His role incorporated the determination of broad research direction and resource allocation, performance monitoring of CSIRO research programs, including its flagship programs, and the development and implementation of organisational strategy.

Before joining CSIRO in 2002, Brungs was a senior manager at McKinsey and Co, managing teams in North America, Asia, New Zealand and Australia.

Some of Brungs' present key appointments include the NSW Innovation and Productivity Council; Committee for Sydney Board; Convenor, NSW Vice-Chancellor's Committee; Chair, Australian Technology Network; and the ATSE Diversity and Equity Committee. His experience includes many distinguished past board and committee memberships, including for not-for-profit organisations, in addition to numerous state and federal government and institutional appointments.

Education
Brungs is a Rhodes Scholar, with a doctorate in inorganic chemistry from Oxford University, and a recipient of the University Medal in Industrial Chemistry from UNSW. He is an alumnus of Saint Ignatius' College, Riverview in Sydney.

Personal life
Brungs grew up in Sydney and is married to artist Kate Gradwell. Brungs and Gradwell have two children together. He is a member of the Sydney Sabre and UTS Fencing Club.

References 

 

 

Australian academic administrators
Living people
Alumni of the University of Oxford
Australian Rhodes Scholars
Academic staff of the University of Technology Sydney
Australian chemists
University of New South Wales alumni
People educated at Saint Ignatius' College, Riverview
Fellows of the Royal Society of New South Wales
Fellows of the Australian Academy of Technological Sciences and Engineering
1972 births